Big Rich Texas is an American reality television series on the Style Network that premiered on July 17, 2011. The show is filmed in the Dallas/Fort Worth area of Texas. The series follows five wealthy Texas women and their daughters. The first season of the show premiered on July 17, 2011 following a spin off from the show Dallas Divas and Daughters that originally aired in 2009 on Bravo TV and The Style Network. The second season debuted February 19, 2012 with new cast members: Deaynni, Amber and Shaye Hatley. In 2014 Season 4 was green lit and ready for production.  The network negotiated bringing back Pamela Martin-Duarte and a new cast, with co star Bon Blossman and her daughter Whitney moving on to Whitney's Having a Baby.  Subsequently Big Rich Texas season 4 was put on hold due to the decision by NBC Universal to replace the Style Network with the Esquire Network in order to increase their much needed programming for men.  3000 jobs were cut out at Style due to the network changes.

Cast
 Pamela Martin Duarte and her daughter Hannah Duarte
 Connie Dieb and her daughter Grace Dieb
 Leslie Birkland and her goddaughter Kalyn Braun
 Melissa Poe and her daughter Maddie Poe
 Bonnie Blossman and her daughter Whitney Whatley
 DeAynni Hatley and her daughters Amber and Shaye Hatley
 Cynthia Davis and her daughter Alex Davis
 Wendy Walker and her daughter Nikki Walker

Timeline of cast members
  Main cast (appears in opening credits) 
  Secondary cast (appears in green screen confessional segments, reunion segments and/or in end credits alongside the main cast)
  Guest cast (appears in a guest role or cameo)

Episodes

Season 1 (2011)

Season 2 (2012)

Season 3 (2012-13)

Season 4: Whitney's Having a Baby (2014)

References

2010s American reality television series
2011 American television series debuts
2013 American television series endings
Television shows set in Dallas
English-language television shows
Style Network original programming